The Osten House (Danish Ostens Gård) is a Rococo-style townhouse located at Stengade 83 in Helsingør, Denmark. The building was listed on the Danish registry of protected buildings and places in 1918.

History
Customs inspector Hans Jørgen Schrøder owned a property at the site in 1736. Otto Frantz von der Osten acquired the building after being appointed to customs commissioner at Øresund Custom House. He constructed the current building at the site in 1769-1770. The architect is not known.

Otto Frantz von der Osten's younger brother, Adolph Sigfried von der Osten, had been appointed to director of Øresund Custom House by Struense in 1770. Their cousin, Wilhelm August von der Osten (1694-1768), had served as director of Øresund Customs House from 1738 to 1764.

Nicolai Jacob Jessen (1718-1800), who had been appointed to accountant at Øresund Custom House in 1778, acquired the building in 1780. He had played an important role in the coup against Struense.

Joost Jacob van Aller (1756-1824), a merchant and Dutch consul in Helsingør, acquired the building in 1794. His widow continued his trading house after his death in 1824. It was later passed on to their sons Peter,  Hendrik og Theodor. The property was owned by the House of de Coninck from 1867 to 1878.

Stengade 83 was acquired by the Wright family in 1901 The family. The family has founded the fuel company Wright og Svendsen. A wide variety of companies have later been tenants in the building.

Cultural references
Karen Blixen's short story The Supper at Elsinore in Seven Gothic Tales is set in the building.

References

External links
 Stengade 83 at Helsingør Leksikon

Houses in Helsingør Municipality
Listed buildings and structures in Helsingør Municipality
Rococo architecture in Denmark
Houses completed in 1770
1770 establishments in Denmark